Greenville–Spartanburg International Airport  (Roger Milliken Field) is near Greer, South Carolina, United States, midway between Greenville and Spartanburg, the major cities of the Upstate region. The airport is the second-busiest airport in South Carolina, after Charleston International Airport with about 2.61 million passengers in 2019.

The Federal Aviation Administration (FAA) National Plan of Integrated Airport Systems for 2017–2021 categorized it as a small-hub primary commercial service facility.

History
Before construction of the Greenville–Spartanburg International Airport (GSP), each city had its own airport and competed for airline service. In the mid-1950s Roger Milliken, a textile heir, industrialist, businessman (CEO of Milliken & Company), worked with other Upstate business leaders to get a shared airport for the two cities. In 1958 a proposal for an airport between the two cities was presented to the legislative delegation for the two counties, which approved the construction and the creation of an airport commission, headed by Milliken.

GSP opened on October 15, 1962, replacing Greenville Downtown Airport as the primary airline destination in the region. In the 1980s, GSP expanded its terminal and cargo facilities, and the runway was lengthened twice in the 1990s. In 2004, the airfield was named for Milliken.

Having been served by legacy carriers, with large hubs in nearby Atlanta and Charlotte, GSP had long been plagued with high fares. The arrival of low-cost carriers in recent years has reduced fares and increased passenger figures.  Allegiant Air began flights to Florida in 2006, and in 2011 Southwest Airlines began service to five cities.

Local officials attribute Southwest's presence to an unprecedented 38% growth in passenger figures between 2010 and 2011. In 2011 GSP received an ANNIE Award from Airline and Airport News & Analysis for being the fastest-growing small airport in the United States. In 2012 the U.S. Department of Transportation's Bureau of Travel Statistics reported that average fares from GSP decreased by 14%; the largest decrease in the country.

Facilities

The airport is mostly in Spartanburg County with a portion in Greenville County. It is in an unincorporated area, adjacent to sections of Greer.

The airport has one terminal building with two concourses: Concourse A (gates A1–A9), and Concourse B (gates B1–B4). The check-in level is the same for all passengers. In 2012 the airport embarked on a four-year, $102 million terminal improvement program which would modernize the terminal and improve passenger flow, as well as prepare for future expansion.  Future planning includes several options, i.e., the expansion of the terminal by 300% of its current capacity and the possibility of the addition of second runway, parallel to the existing one.

Concourse A is used by American, Southwest, Silver Airways, Contour Airlines and United. Allegiant Air and Delta use Concourse B.

The airport can handle up to 250 passengers per hour through immigration and customs checkpoints.

FedEx has a major package facility on the north end of the airport, and BMW has a facility which supports easy transfer of arriving parts to the company's manufacturing facility, three miles to the east.

The airport was the facility used for many equestrian teams to deliver horses to and from the 2018 FEI World Equestrian Games in nearby Tryon, North Carolina.

Airlines and destinations

Passenger

GSP is serviced by seven passenger airlines and their regional affiliates. All service is domestic.

Cargo

In July 2016 GSP airport and Senator International of Germany announced that a regularly scheduled twice-weekly freight service would begin in November between Greenville/Spartanburg and Munich, Germany. The freight service would be the first scheduled international route for the airport. Senator International began the international freight service to Germany in November, operated by Air Atlanta Icelandic with a Boeing 747-400F aircraft, to both Munich and Frankfurt–Hahn.

Statistics

Top destinations

Airline market share

Annual traffic

References

External links

 Greenville–Spartanburg International Airport, official site
 
 

Airports in South Carolina
Transportation in Greenville, South Carolina
Buildings and structures in Greenville County, South Carolina
Buildings and structures in Spartanburg County, South Carolina
Airports established in 1962
1962 establishments in South Carolina